Mesothuria is a genus of sea cucumbers belonging to the family Synallactidae. The genus has a cosmopolitan distribution.

Species
The following species are recognised in the genus Mesothuria:
Mesothuria abberviata Koehler & Vaney, 1905
Mesothuria abbreviata Koehler & Vaney, 1905
Mesothuria bifurcata Hérouard, 1901
Mesothuria carnosa Fisher, 1907
Mesothuria cathedralis Heding, 1940
Mesothuria crebrapedes Cherbonnier & Féral, 1981
Mesothuria deani Mitsukuri, 1912
Mesothuria edwardensis Massin, 1992
Mesothuria gargantua Deichmann, 1930
Mesothuria holothurioides Sluiter, 1901
Mesothuria incerta Koehler & Vaney, 1905
Mesothuria intestinalis (Ascanius, 1805)
Mesothuria magellani (Ludwig, 1883)
Mesothuria maroccana Perrier R., 1898
Mesothuria megapoda Clark, 1920
Mesothuria milleri Gebruk & Solis-Marin in Gebruk, Solis-Marin, Billett, Rogacheva & Tyler, 2012
Mesothuria multipes (Ludwig, 1893)
Mesothuria multipora Clark, 1920
Mesothuria murrayi (Théel, 1886)
Mesothuria oktaknemoides Heding, 1940
Mesothuria oktaknemus Sluiter, 1901
Mesothuria regularia Heding, 1940
Mesothuria roulei (Koehler, 1895)
Mesothuria rugosa Hérouard, 1912
Mesothuria squamosa Koehler & Vaney, 1905
Mesothuria sufflava Cherbonnier & Féral, 1984
Mesothuria verrilli (Théel, 1886)

References

Holothuriida
Holothuroidea genera